The curfew bell was a bell rung in the evening in Medieval England as a curfew signal.

History

The custom of ringing the curfew bell continued in many British towns and cities, especially in the north of England, well into the 19th century, although by then it had ceased to have any legal status. The tradition is still practiced in the town of Sandwich, Kent, where a curfew bell known as the "Pig Bell" at St Peter's Church is rung at 8 pm every evening for ten minutes. At Ruthin in Denbighshire, the custom lapsed in the 1970s but was revived in 2020 after the bells of St Peter's Church were restored.

Etymology

At Penrith, Cumbria in the 19th century, the curfew was known as the "Taggy Bell", thought to be derived from the Old Norse tœkke, "to cover".

Poetry 
The tyranny of William I is described by the poet Francis Thompson,

Chaucer writes on the curfew bell as just as a time, not a law:

Shakespeare had unusual times for the curfew bell. In Romeo and Juliet, iv 4, he has Lord Capulet saying:

In Tempest, v. 1, Prospero says:

In King Lear, iii. 4, Edgar speaks,

In the sixteenth century Bishop Joseph Hall's "Fourth Satire" it reads:

In the play The Merry Devil of Edmonton (published 1608), the curfew was at nine o'clock in the evening:

John Milton's put in his allegorical Il Penseroso'''s mouth the words:

In Handel's L'Allegro, il Penseroso ed il Moderato these words are accompanied by a pizzicato bass-line, representing a distant bell sound.

The most famous mention of the curfew in English poetry is in Thomas Gray's Elegy Written in a Country Churchyard (1750), whose opening lines are:

T. S. Eliot Gus the theater cat ("Old possum's book of practical cats")

Eleanor Farjeon and Herbert Farjeon, William  I – 1066 in Kings and Queens (1932). These poems were used to teach history to generations of British schoolchildren:

Notes

Bibliography

 Andrews, William, Old Church Lore, William Andrews & Company, The Hull Press; London, 1891
 Brand, John et al.,Observations on the Popular Antiquities of Great Britain: Chiefly Illustrating the Origin of Our Vulgar and Provincial Customs, Ceremonies, and Superstitions, George Bell and Sons, 1901
 Thomas, Michael Joseph, "Missing The Curfew: A Cultural History Case For Re-Reading Thomas Gray's Most Famous Line" (2016). Graduate College Dissertations and Theses. Paper 590.
Anthony Wood and John Peshall, The Antient and Present State of the City of Oxford: Containing an Account of Its Foundation, Antiquity, Situation, Suburbs, Division by Wards, Walls, Castle, Fairs, Religious Houses, Abbeys, St. Frideswede's, Churches, as Well Those Destroyed as the Present, with Their Monumental Inscriptions'', J. and F. Rivington, 1773, Oxford University

Emergency laws
Political repression
Public law
National security
English society
Medieval culture